Phoronis embryolabi is a species of marine horseshoe worm in the phylum Phoronida. It is found in Vostok Bay, where it lives together with Nihonotrypaea japonica, an Axiidea shrimp species, in its burrows.

A phylogenetic analysis in 2018 suggests that Phoronis embryolabi is most closely related to Phoronis pallida.

References

Phoronids
Animals described in 2017